The Akwaya massacre happened on 25 June 2022, when militants killed at least 26 civilians in the village of  in Akwaya commune, Southwest Cameroon.

Background

There had been a long-standing territorial dispute between the villages of Ballin and Mavass, inhabited by the Mesaka and Oliti ethnic groups, respectively. A spokesperson from the Presbyterian Church of Cameroon said that peace talks were being organized, but that representatives from neither of the communities agreed to attend. According to local sources, the massacre was preceded by the killing of Oliti men who had set up control posts in Ballin a few days prior.

Massacre

The attackers set fire to more than fifty houses and attacked the residence of Marin Aka, a local politician who had been attending his brother's funeral. Authorities recovered at least 26 bodies, including five Nigerians, although the estimated death toll was 32. The perpetrators also destroyed a hospital during the massacre.

Cameroonian health authorities were unable to organize an evacuation of the wounded, so villagers had to transport them to the nearest health center themselves. Those with severe injuries were evacuated to Nigeria for treatment. According to the Presbyterian Church of Cameroon, a number died before they reached a Nigerian hospital.

Perpetrators

Government authorities said that the massacre had been committed by Ambazonian insurgents, which the rebels denied and instead suggested it had been committed by Nigerian rebels. The Presbyterian Church of Cameroon reported that the Akwaya massacre was actually related to a land dispute between Ballin and the neighbouring village of Mavass. Local officials said that Mavass had hired Ambazonian separatists to carry out the attack.

References 

2022 in Cameroon
2022 mass shootings in Africa
2022 murders in Cameroon
21st-century mass murder in Cameroon
Anglophone Crisis
Arson in Africa
Arson in the 2020s
Attacks on buildings and structures in 2022
Attacks on buildings and structures in Africa
Attacks on hospitals
June 2022 crimes in Africa
Massacres in 2022
Massacres in Cameroon
Southwest Region (Cameroon)
Unsolved mass murders